Lormes is a commune in the Nièvre department in central France.

The mystic Simon Ganneau (1805–1851) was born in Lormes, as was the writer Henri Bachelin (1879–1941), winner of the 1918 Prix Femina for Le Serviteur.

Demographics
On 1 January 2019, the estimated population was 1,273.

See also
Communes of the Nièvre department
Parc naturel régional du Morvan

References

External links
Lormes.net (Unofficial website) 
Lormes.fr (Official website) 

Communes of Nièvre